Ma Ji (2 August 1934 – 20 December 2006), born Ma Shuhuai, was a Chinese xiangsheng comedian. He was one of his generation's most popular and influential xiangsheng performers and was mentor to many younger performers. His disciples include Jiang Kun, Zhao Yan, Liu Wei, Feng Gong, Xiaolin, Wang Qianxiang, Li Zengrui, Han Lancheng, Liu Xiyao, Peng Ziyi, Yin Zhuolin, Yao Xinguang, Zhao Longjun, Xing Yingying, Liu Lixin, and Hou Guannan.

Biography 
Ma Ji was born in Tianjin on 2 August 1934. After the Communists took over mainland China, Ma started to work in Xinhua bookstore. He joined the Central Broadcasting Recitation and Ballad Troupe as a professional xiangsheng performer in 1956. He studied under Hou Baolin and became a seventh-generation xiangsheng performer. He got his stage name Ma Ji from the film Mattie the Goose-boy (1950 film), which is based on the poem of the same name by Mihály Fazekas.

As a notable xiangsheng master and performer, Ma Ji created his own art style and made great contributions to China's Xiangsheng art.

In the mid to late 1980s, together with his disciple Zhao Yan, he frequently travelled to Singapore on performance tours and proved to be very popular there as well.

Ma Ji was also a member of the 5th Chinese People's Political Consultative Conference.

Famous works
"Ode to Mountain Climbers"
"The Portrait"
"Dispute of the Five Sense Organs"
Performed with many comedians together in “Five Officers Contend for Fame”

Dialogues
Ode to Friendship
Storm on the State
Multistory Restaurant

Monlogues
“The Universal Brand Cigarette” playing a cigarette salesman with a bad product and satirizing newly rich Chinese preoccupation with brand names.

Death
Ma Ji died on 20 December 2006 at Beijing, China. The cause of his death was myocardial infarction. His death, of a heart attack, was reported by Chinese Central Television (CCTV). He is survived by his son, Ma Dong.

References

External links 
 Ma Ji, Chinese comedian famed for satirical sketches, dies at 72, The Associated Press via the International Herald Tribune

1934 births
2006 deaths
Chinese male stage actors
Chinese xiangsheng performers
Male actors from Tianjin
People's Republic of China politicians from Tianjin
20th-century comedians